USS Omaha (LCS-12) is an  of the United States Navy. She is the fourth ship to be named for Omaha, the largest city in Nebraska. The vessel's keel was laid down on 18 February 2015 at the Austal USA shipyard in Mobile, Alabama and launched on 20 November. The ship was commissioned at San Diego, California on 3 February 2018 and was assigned to Littoral Combat Ship Squadron One.

Design
In 2002, the United States Navy initiated a program to develop the first of a fleet of littoral combat ships. The Navy initially ordered two trimaran hulled ships from General Dynamics, which became known as the  after the first ship of the class, . Even-numbered U.S. Navy littoral combat ships are built using the Independence-class trimaran design, while odd-numbered ships are based on a competing design, the conventional monohull . The initial order of littoral combat ships involved a total of four ships, including two of the Independence-class design. On 29 December 2010, the Navy announced that it was awarding Austal USA a contract to build ten additional Independence-class littoral combat ships.

Construction and career
The vessel was ordered from Austal USA with a contract awarded on 29 December 2010. The ceremonial laying of the keel was on 18 February 2015, at their shipyard in Mobile, Alabama.
Omaha was launched from Austal USA's shipyards in Mobile, Alabama on 20 November 2015. Omaha was christened on 19 December 2015.  The ship's sponsor was Omaha philanthropist Susie Buffett. The littoral combat ship was the fourth ship to be named for Omaha, the largest city in Nebraska. Omaha was commissioned on 3 February 2018 in San Diego, California. She was assigned to Littoral Combat Ship Squadron One.

UFO incident 
On 15 July 2019 alleged multiple UFOs were tracked on the ship's radar while training off the coast of San Diego. Subsequent investigation by the Pentagon's Unidentified Aerial Phenomena Task Force (UAPTF) failed to determine the nature or origin of the phenomena, which remain unexplained.

References

External links
 

 

2015 ships
Independence-class littoral combat ships